Banspani Railway Station is a NSG-6 category small halt station of Indian Railways located near Joda Municipality/Block/Town. The name 'BANSPANI' is derived from the nearest tribal village 'Banshapani' is located near another remote area tribal village Khuntpani of JODA BLOCK and BARBIL TAHSIL. It's fall on RKSN-JRLI-JKPR line, which is dedicated rail route for freight trains only. So the railway never wants to increase the frequency of  existing few coach trains and always refuses to run any new trains through here also.

This halt station situates beside the BSPX Railway Siding, known as the 2nd highest iron ore loading place of odisha state and 5th highest loading place of India. The Railway station is just carved out from the Railway Siding (loading place) with a small retaining wall and created with only 1 number of platform of 280metre length which is capable to handle only 11 ICF coaches and 9 LHB coaches, which is comparatively too low to handle now-a-days running 22 LHB coach trains with locomotives. The station has not facilitated with the basic amenities such as - General Waiting Hall, Reservation Counter, Food Stalls, Secure Boundaries etc. There is not any direct approach road to this station from Joda Town, so people cover 5 to 6km distance to go to there and as per SER DRM, the station can’t be develop any more for unavailability of land. A second new entrance with new station building proposed at right side (near the pond, North-West side) of the current station but land acquisition is a key hurdle for this proposed project. If the project will process, then a proper direct approach road will be provide by the Municipality from Joda Town’s Joda CHC to the Banspani Railway Station’s 2nd new entrance with a integrated new Bus Terminal project which will be built at opposite of Joda CHC, :-the master plan source.

Also, a new station is proposed near JBCN (Joda Block Cabin) by the Municipality, but railway authorities always denying to do not affect the mining despatch process of tata steal’s Joda east iron mine. For the Railways the Industrial prospective is much more valuable than the sentiments and needs of the people here. 

This small halt station caters one of the major mining affected areas of Odisha state is known as Joda Town/Block/Municipality. It also caters the Barbil City/Tehsil/Municipality which is just 14km away from Joda Town and well connected through 4laned NH-520. Barbil has its own railway station BBN is fall under Padapahar Junction - Bolanikhadan branch line section which ends at Bolanikhadan. So Barbil people prefers the Banspani station to get the trains for long distanced intra state destinations like Visakhapatnam, Chennai etc.

Key Projects Related to BANSPANI Railway Station

	Barbil - Banspani 17km New Line (Which will provide direct connectivity to Joda Town from Barbil City, Project is owned by ORIDL, DPR completed for this project and got in-principal approval by Railway Ministry and now waiting for final approval and start of execution process by both State Govt and Railway Ministry). 

	Deojhar (DJHR) - Badampahar Via- Champua 110km New Line (Survey completed in 2022 by SER but Kendujhargarh-Badampahar 80km new line will take place instead of this project in according passenger's choice).

	Dangoaposi - Jaroli 3rd & 4th Line (Much essential project for ease traffic and to remove bottle neck situation under Gati Shakti Mission also known as the Logistic Mission 2030 to meet the future needs of steel industries, Survey completed in March 2023).

	Barbil - Kiriburu 24km New Line (Essential project to provide raw materials to Rourkela Steel Plant and Rourkela connectivity from Barbil with short distance, Fund allocation started from 2023-24 union budget).

	Barbil - Sanindpur - Barsuan - Sanindpur - Nayagrh 108 km Triangle Line (Mines connectivity with ports, Survey completed on 2022, Railway fooled the public and got NGT clearances in feb-2023 in the name of Janjatiya Corridor-'Birsa Munda Corridor').

Total Trains Ply Through BANSPANI

  18415/18416 Barbil – Puri & Puri – Barbil Express (the 1st passenger train of here)

	20815/20816 Visakhapatnam – Tatanagar – Visakhapatnam Weekly SF Express

	08047 Puri – Tatanagar – Puri Weekly Express (Cancelled due to low patronage after few trips)

	08067 Hatia - Visakhapatnam – Hatia Weekly GR Express (Cancelled due to low patronage)

	07438/07439 Kacheguda – Tatanagar – Kacheguda Weekly Special (Cancelled due to low patronage between TATA & CTC and improper schedule for Banspani like undeveloped stations)

	08041/08042 Shalimar – Tambaram – Shalimar Weekly Special Fare Express (It would be a success train just because of Kolkata connection which is most demandable of this region but suddenly cancelled on next day after announcement for unknown reasons)

	08067/08068 Ranchi – Villupuram – Ranchi Weekly Special Fare Express (Cancelled after a month. Good patronage observed but SER don't want to run any coach train in this Rajkharsuan-Banspani-Jakhapura line. This line is dedicated for freights train only.)

References 

Railway stations in Kendujhar district
Chakradharpur railway division